Just Between You and Me may refer to:

Albums
 Just Between You and Me (Dolly Parton and Porter Wagoner album), 1968
 Just Between You and Me (The Kinleys album), 1997

Songs
 "Just Between You and Me" (April Wine song)
 "Just Between You and Me" (DC Talk song)
 "Just Between You and Me" (Lou Gramm song)
 "Just Between You and Me" (The Kinleys song)
 "Just Between You and Me" (Charley Pride song)
 "Just Between You and Me", a song by The Chordettes

See also
Between You and Me (disambiguation)
Just Between Us (disambiguation)